

The Sherbrooke Regiment was a regiment of the Canadian Militia and later the Canadian Army Reserve that existed from 1866 to 1965. Originally an infantry regiment, during the Second World War the regiment helped form the 27th Armoured Regiment (The Sherbrooke Fusilier Regiment) which served as an armoured (tank) unit in the 2nd Canadian Armoured Brigade. In 1946, the regiment itself was converted to an armoured regiment was redesignated as The Sherbrooke Regiment (RCAC). In 1965, the regiment was Amalgamated with the 7th/11th Hussars to form The Sherbrooke Hussars.

Lineage

The Sherbrooke Regiment (RCAC) 

 Originated on 21 September 1866, in Melbourne, Quebec, as the Sherbrooke Battalion of Infantry.
 Redesignated on 15 March 1867, as the 53rd Sherbrooke Battalion of Infantry.
 Reorganized on 22 March 1867, as two separate battalions: the 53rd Melbourne Battalion of Infantry (later the 11th Hussars) and the 54th Sherbrooke Battalion of Infantry.
 Redesignated on 10 May 1867, as the 53rd Sherbrooke Battalion of Infantry.
 Redesignated on 8 May 1900, as the 53rd Sherbrooke Regiment.
 Redesignated on 29 March 1920, as The Sherbrooke Regiment.
 Redesignated on 15 December 1936, as The Sherbrooke Regiment (MG).
 Redesignated on 1 February 1941, as The Sherbrooke Regiment.
 Redesignated on 7 November 1940, as the 2nd (Reserve) Battalion, The Sherbrooke Regiment.
 Redesignated on 1 April 1946, as the 12th Armoured Regiment (Sherbrooke Regiment), RCAC.
 Redesignated on 4 February 1949, as The Sherbrooke Regiment (12th Armoured Regiment).
 Redesignated on 19 May 1958, as The Sherbrooke Regiment (RCAC).
 Amalgamated on 15 February 1965, with the 7th/11th Hussars, and Redesignated as The Sherbrooke Hussars.

Perpetuations

The Great War 

 117th (Eastern Townships) Battalion, CEF

The Second World War 

 The Sherbrooke Fusilier Regiment

History

Early History 
With the passing of the Militia Act of 1855, the first of a number of newly raised independent militia companies were established in and around the Eastern Townships region of Canada East (now the Province of Quebec).

On 21 September 1866, the Sherbrooke Battalion of Infantry was authorized for service by the regimentation of six of these previously authorized independent militia rifle and infantry companies. The Battalion's Headquarters was located at Melbourne and had Companies at Sherbrooke, Danville, Melbourne (Kingsbury), Richmond and Lennoxville, Quebec.

On 15 March 1867, the battalion was Reorganized as the 53rd Sherbrooke Battalion of Infantry. On 22 March 1867, the battalion was Redesignated as the 54th Sherbrooke Battalion of Infantry and again on 10 May 1867, as the 53rd Sherbrooke Battalion of Infantry.

On 8 May 1900, the 53rd Sherbrooke Battalion of Infantry was Redesignated as the 53rd Sherbrooke Regiment.

The First World War 
On 6 August 1914, Details of the 53rd Sherbrooke Regiment were placed on active service for local protective duty.

With the formation of the Canadian Expeditionary Force, the regiment provided volunteers for the 12th Battalion, CEF which sailed to the United Kingdom as part of the First Contingent (later the 1st Canadian Division).

On 22 December 1915, the 117th (Eastern Townships) Battalion, CEF was authorized for service and on 14 August 1916, the battalion embarked for Great Britain. After its arrival in the UK, the battalion provided reinforcements for the Canadian Corps in the field. On 8 January 1917, the battalion's personnel were absorbed by the 23rd Reserve Battalion, CEF. On 30 August 1920, the 117th Battalion, CEF was disbanded.

1920s-1930s 
On 1 April 1920, as a result of the Otter Commission and the following post-war reorganization of the militia, the 53rd Sherbrooke Regiment was Redesignated as The Sherbrooke Regiment and was reorganized with 2 battalions (1 of them a paper-only reserve battalion) to perpetuate the assigned war-raised battalions of the Canadian Expeditionary Force.

As a result of the 1936 Canadian Militia Reorganization, on 15 December 1936, The Sherbrooke Regiment was converted to an infantry battalion (Machine Gun) and was Redesignated as The Sherbrooke Regiment (Machine Gun).

Organization

Sherbrooke Battalion of Infantry (21 September 1866) 

 Regimental HQ (Melbourne, Quebec)
 No. 1 Company (Sherbrooke, Quebec) (first raised on 20 March 1856 as the 1st Volunteer Militia Rifle Company of Sherbrooke)
 No. 2 Company (Sherbrooke, Quebec) (first raised on 13 November 1860 as the 2nd Volunteer Militia Rifle Company of Sherbrooke)
 No. 3 Company (Danville, Quebec) (first raised on 17 July 1861 as the First Volunteer Militia Rifle Company of Danville)
 No. 4 Company (Melbourne, Quebec) (first raised on 16 March 1866 as the Melbourne Infantry Company)
 No. 5 Company (Richmond, Quebec) (first raised on 16 March 1866 as the Richmond Infantry Company)
 No. 6 Company (Lennoxville, Quebec) (first raised on 2 June 1866 as the Lennoxville Infantry Company)

The Sherbrooke Regiment (15 September 1921) 

 1st Battalion (perpetuating the 117th Battalion, CEF)
 2nd (Reserve) Battalion

Alliances 

  - The Royal Leicestershire Regiment (Until 1964)

Battle Honours

Great War 

 Arras, 1917, '18
 Hill 70
 Ypres, 1917
 Amiens

Second World War 

 Normandy Landing
 Authie
 Caen
 The Orne
 Bourguébus Ridge
 Faubourg de Vaucelles
 St. André-sur-Orne
 Falaise
 Falaise Road
 Clair Tizon
 The Laison
 Antwerp–Turnhout Canal
 The Scheldt
 The Lower Maas
 The Rhineland
 The Hochwald
 Xanten
 The Rhine
 Emmerich–Hoch Elten
 Zutphen, Deventer
 North-West Europe, 1944–1945

Notable Members 

 Major General Sir Frederick Oscar Warren Loomis, 
 Brigadier-General Sydney Valpy Radley-Walters 
 Captain The Reverend Walter Brown
 Major Edson Warner 
 Major Robert Gilmour Leckie
 David Price

Notes and references 

Armoured regiments of Canada
Infantry regiments of Canada
Sherbrooke Hussars
Military units and formations established in 1866
Military units and formations disestablished in 1965